PS/TSS Duchess of Sutherland was a paddle steamer cargo vessel operated by the London and North Western Railway from 1868 to 1908.

History

She was built by A. Leslie and Company for the London and North Western Railway in 1868.

On 8 September 1875, she collided with the paddle steamer Edith in Holyhead which resulted in the sinking of Edith.

She was converted from a paddle steamer to a twin screw steamer in 1888 by Cammell Laird of Birkenhead.

References

1868 ships
Steamships
Ships built on the River Tyne
Ships of the London and North Western Railway
Paddle steamers of the United Kingdom